Futebol Clube Primeira Camisa, commonly known as Primeira Camisa, is a currently inactive Brazilian football club based in São José dos Campos, São Paulo state.

History
The club was founded on March 3, 2007, by the former footballer Roque Júnior, and professionalized its football department in 2007, competing for the first time in a professional competition in the 2008 Campeonato Paulista Segunda Divisão, when they were eliminated in the First Stage of the competition.

Stadium

Futebol Clube Primeira Camisa play their home games at Estádio ADC Parahyba. The stadium has a maximum capacity of 2,500 people.

References

Association football clubs established in 2007
Football clubs in São Paulo (state)
Organisations based in São José dos Campos
2007 establishments in Brazil